Uel Melvin Eubanks (born in Quinlan, Texas, February 14, 1903; died in Dallas, Texas, November 21, 1954) was a pitcher for the Chicago Cubs from July 20, 1922, to August 25, 1922. Eubanks pitched in two career games, one of which is the highest-scoring game in modern MLB history, a 26-23 Cubs victory over the Philadelphia Phillies.  Eubanks gave up eight runs in 2/3 of an inning in this game.

Eubanks hit a double in his only at-bat in Major League Baseball, thus retiring with a 1.000% batting average for the Cubs. After his brief stint in the majors, he spent 6 years playing for minor league teams.

Personal
Eubanks was known for being a heavy drinker, and according to Baseball Almanac, he was arrested for possession of alcohol during Prohibition. He died at age 51 in 1954 from a cerebral hemorrhage.

References

External links

1903 births
1954 deaths
Major League Baseball pitchers
Baseball players from Texas
Chicago Cubs players
People from Hunt County, Texas